8900 AAVSO, provisional designation , is a stony background asteroid from the central region of the asteroid belt, approximately 5.5 kilometers in diameter. It was discovered by American amateur astronomer Dennis di Cicco at the U.S Sudbury Observatory , Massachusetts, on 24 October 1995. The asteroid was  named after the American Association of Variable Star Observers (AAVSO).

Orbit and classification 

AAVSO is a non-family asteroid from the main belt's background population. It orbits the Sun in the central main-belt at a distance of 2.2–2.9 AU once every 4.04 years (1,475 days). Its orbit has an eccentricity of 0.15 and an inclination of 9° with respect to the ecliptic. The first precovery was obtained at Kleť Observatory in 1979, extending the asteroid's observation arc by 16 years prior to its discovery.

Naming 

This minor planet was named after the American Association of Variable Star Observers (AAVSO), an astronomical pro-am organization that promotes the study of variable stars to both amateur and professional astronomers, maintaining the largest database of variable star observations in the world.

AAVSO was founded in 1911 by amateur astronomer William Tyler Olcott (1873–1936), based on a suggestion by Edward Charles Pickering's (1846–1919), after whom the minor planet 784 Pickeringia is named. The official naming citation was published by the Minor Planet Center on 1 May 2003 .

Physical characteristics

Lightcurve 

In May 2010, a rotational lightcurve of AAVSO was obtained at the Palomar Transient Factory in California. Lightcurve analysis gave a rotation period of  hours with a brightness variation of 0.43 in magnitude.

Diameter and albedo 

According to the NEOWISE mission of NASA's space-based Wide-field Infrared Survey Explorer, AAVSO measures 5.8 kilometers in diameter and its surface has an albedo of 0.28, while the Collaborative Asteroid Lightcurve Link assumes a standard albedo for stony asteroids of 0.20 and calculates a diameter of 5.3 kilometers.

References

External links 
 M.P.C. 48317 Minor Planets Circular, 2003 
 Asteroid Lightcurve Database (LCDB), query form (info )
 Dictionary of Minor Planet Names, Google books
 Asteroids and comets rotation curves, CdR – Observatoire de Genève, Raoul Behrend
 Discovery Circumstances: Numbered Minor Planets (5001)-(10000) – Minor Planet Center
 
 

008900
Discoveries by Dennis di Cicco
Named minor planets
19951024